Reynaldo "Gosh" R. Dilay (born February 6, 1985) is a Filipino musician best known as the bassist, backing vocalist and the primary composer & lyricist of the band Sponge Cola.

Early life
Dilay attended high school at Ateneo de Manila University.

Career
Between 1998 and 2002, Ysmael "Yael" Yuzon, met Reynaldo "Gosh" Dilay through the school's theater guild, Teatro Baguntao. Yuzon was then the frontman of a rock band called White Chapel together with some talented individuals in Ateneo High School. Nevertheless, he decided to form a band with Dilay and two other members of the theater guild. They named the group Sponge after R.S. Surtee's Mr. Sponge's Sporting Tour. Later however, they learned about a Detroit grunge band already using the name Sponge, so they just simply decided to add “cola,” to give their name more semblance. The band won in several high school competitions boosting their popularity not just in their school but in other campuses, as well. The band's breakthrough in the mainstream was when they signed up for a record distribution under Sony BMG Records Philippines. The band is currently signed up for Universal Records.

Dilay composed the hits "Una", "'Di Na Mababawi", "Wala Kang Katulad" and "Tuliro" which won them Favorite Music Video on Myx Music Awards 2008 and the hit ballad "Kay Tagal Kitang Hinintay".

The song "Tambay", which Yuzon co-wrote with Dilay, receives an outstanding Diamond record award with over 150,000 copies sold.

Discography

With Sponge Cola
Palabas (2004)
Transit (2006)
Sponge Cola (2008)
Araw Oras Tagpuan (2011)
Ultrablessed (2014)

EPs
Sponge Cola EP (2003)
Tambay EP (2011)
District EP (2012)

Collaborations
Super Size Rock (2003)
Tunog Acoustic 3 (2004)
Ultraelectromagneticjam: The Music of The Eraserheads (2005)
Kami nAPO muna (2006)
Super! The Biggest OPM Hits Of The Year (2006)
Pinoy Biggie Hits Vol. 2 (2006)
Kami nAPO Muna Ulit (2007)
Palabas: Best of OPM TV Themes (2007)
Astig...The Biggest Band Hits (2008)

References 

1985 births
Living people
21st-century Filipino musicians
Ateneo de Manila University alumni
Filipino composers
Filipino bass guitarists